Unhappy China: The Great Time, Grand Vision and Our Challenges is a book written by Song Qiang, Huang Jisu, Song Xiaojun, Wang Xiaodong and Liu Yang and published in March 2009. The book, a follow up to China Can Say No, encourages China to become a hegemon rather than getting cast aside.

The book was a bestseller, selling over 100,000 copies in the month after publication. In contrast, the Chinese newspaper Shanghai Daily reported that the book "caused a stir among some experts and scholars" but "failed to strike a chord among average Chinese",  and some readers reject the book as "bitter rant of ultra left-wing intellectuals who feel sidelined under Beijing’s policies of reform and opening."

See also
 Currency Wars

References

Chinese-language books